Tweety is  a fictional canary in Looney Tunes and Merrie Melodies.

Tweety may also refer to:

Tweety Carter, American basketball player
Tweety González (born 1963), Argentine musician
Tweety Walters (born 1976), Jamaican soccer player

See also
Tweetie Pie, a 1947 Academy Award-winning animated short
Tweetie, a client for the social networking website Twitter
Tweet (disambiguation)
Twitty (disambiguation)
Tweedy (disambiguation)

Lists of people by nickname